David Flynn (born March 21, 1989 in Warsaw, Indiana) is an American soccer player who played for the Harrisburg City Islanders in the USL Pro.

Career

College and amateur
Flynn played four years of college soccer at St. Bonaventure University between 2007 and 2010.

Professional
Flynn signed with USL Pro club Pittsburgh Riverhounds in December 2013, before moving to Harrisburg City Islanders in April 2013.

He made his professional debut on August 23, 2014 as a 33rd-minute substitute in a 2-2 draw against Rochester Rhinos.

References

External links
 USL bio

1989 births
Living people
American soccer players
St. Bonaventure Bonnies men's soccer players
Pittsburgh Riverhounds SC players
Penn FC players
Association football goalkeepers
USL Championship players
Soccer players from Indiana